Elvin A. "Al" Papik (August 25, 1926 – May 7, 2022) was an American football coach. He served as the 26th head football coach at Doane College in Crete, Nebraska, for 16 seasons, from 1955 until 1970.  His coaching record at Doane was 80–52–9.

Papik twice took his team to the Mineral Water Bowl, scoring a 14–14 tie against William Jewell in 1967 and recording a 10–0 victory against Central Missouri State in 1968.  The 1968 season gave Doane an undefeated 10–0 schedule, outscoring their opponents 468 to 64.

Head coaching record

References

1926 births
2022 deaths
American football guards
Doane Tigers athletic directors
Doane Tigers football coaches
Doane Tigers football players